The Taoyuan Pauian Archiland, also translated as Taoyuan Pure-Youth Construction, is a semi-professional basketball team formerly in the Super Basketball League (SBL) of Taiwan.

History

The franchise derives its history from the celebrated Hung Kuo Elephants (宏國象) as they created the only dynasty of the defunct Chinese Basketball Alliance in Taiwan (CBA-Taiwan) between 1996 and 1998.  Under the previous ownership by Sina.com and corporate sponsorship by BenQ, the team had also competed in the Chinese Basketball Association of the People's Republic of China (CBA-PRC) in the 2001–2002 and 2002–2003 seasons as the Sina Lions (新浪獅) or BenQ-Sina Lions (明基新浪獅) before becoming a founding member of the SBL in 2003.

During the CBA-Taiwan period, the Elephants were the unmatched three-time champions and the most favored squad holding a considerably larger share of young fans attending the game compared with the other clubs in the league.  Nonetheless, they did not have a chance to defend their third championship because the league was discontinued midway through the 1998–1999 season due to financial problems.  In the aftermath of the league's sudden close down, the club had hit its own financial drought until it was rescued by Sina.com from the brink of disbandment around 2000.

As the Sina Lions, they moved to join the other professional league abbreviated as "CBA" in mainland China.  Having played from a homecourt in Suzhou, Jiangsu Province, China, the Lions made the quarter-finals in their first year with the CBA-PRC but finished 13th out of 14 teams in the league with a disappointing 7–19 record in the ensuing season and dropped out from the top-tier Division A league (甲级A组联赛).  The club then withdrew from mainland China and moved back to Taiwan to join the newly founded SBL there.  In the SBL's inaugural 2003–2004 season, the Lions had a second-place finish and was the runner up in the championship series against the Yulon Dinos, their long-time rival in Taiwan.

Following the retirement – forced or voluntary – of a number of aged starters, the younger Lions ended up with an embarrassing 3–27 record in the 2004–2005 season.  Between 2005 and 2007, the team was turned over between various corporate owners/sponsors including YMY Telephone Marketing (幼敏電銷), Azio TV (東風衛視), and Pauian Archiland (璞園建築), the current owner of the team.  With the improvement of the young players on the team, Pauian has been able to register increasing wins and made its first postseason appearance since the Lions period in 2008.

On July 11, 2022, the team has announced that they will rent their spot in SBL to Changhua County Basketball Team for the next two seasons.

Notable players

Head coaches

Season-by-season record

Honours
ABA Club Championship
 Champions (1): 2011
 Runners-up (1): 2012

See also
 Chinese Basketball Alliance (Taiwan)
 Chinese Basketball Association (PRC)
 Super Basketball League (SBL)

References
  Sina Scoreboard 
  SINA Lions join the CBA
 Taipei Times: Taiwan's basketball team in China says it is quitting league
  BenQ name change

Chinese Basketball Association former teams
Super Basketball League teams
Basketball teams established in 1986
1986 establishments in Taiwan
Sports team relocations
Sport in Taoyuan City
Sport in Taichung